Macrosiphoniella pseudoartemisiae, also known as Macrosiphoniella (Macrosiphoniella) pseudoartemisiae, is an aphid in the superfamily Aphidoidea in the order Hemiptera. It is a true bug and sucks sap from plants. The species was first described by Shinji in 1933.

References 

 http://aphid.speciesfile.org/Common/basic/Taxa.aspx?TaxonNameID=1168264
 http://animaldiversity.org/accounts/Macrosiphoniella_pseudoartemisiae/classification/
 
 http://www.fcla.edu/FlaEnt/fe89p111.pdf

Agricultural pest insects
Insects described in 1933
Macrosiphini